Matugga–Kapeeka Road is a road in central Uganda, connecting the towns of Matugga in Wakiso District and Kapeeka in Nakaseke District.

Location
The coordinates of the road near Semuto are 0°37'33.0"N, 32°19'13.0"E (Latitude:0.625833; Longitude:32.320278).

Overview
Prior to 2009, the road had a gravel surface. In 2008, the government of Uganda began to upgrade the road from gravel to bitumen at an estimated cost of US$20 million. 65 percent of the funding was provided by the government while 35 percent was provided by the Nordic Development Fund. The work was carried out by the Chongqing International Construction Corporation. COWI A/S, a Danish consultancy firm, supervised the work. Construction was completed in the second half of 2010. It was reported in October 2010 that completion would occur as planned, in December 2010.

See also
 List of roads in Uganda

References

External links
 UNRA Undertakes Road Development Projects In Uganda

Roads in Uganda
Wakiso District
Nakaseke District